New Rock is a rock, 105 m high, lying  off the southwest coast of Deception Island, in the South Shetland Islands. The name of the rock derives from its relatively recent charting in about 1929.

References

Geography of Deception Island
Rock formations of the South Shetland Islands